The men's discus throw at the 1934 European Athletics Championships was held in Turin, Italy, at the  Stadio Benito Mussolini on 8 September 1934.

Medalists

Results

Final
8 September

Qualification
8 September

Participation
According to an unofficial count, 18 athletes from 13 countries participated in the event.

 (1)
 (1)
 (1)
 (1)
 (2)
 (1)
 (2)
 (2)
 (2)
 (1)
 (1)
 (1)
 (2)

References

Discus throw
Discus throw at the European Athletics Championships